Wide Angle Software is a United Kingdom-based software development company, headquartered in Stafford, England. The company was founded in 2006. Wide Angle Software is known for producing media management software and applications including software for PC, Mac, iOS and Android. The company develops software for manipulating digital media on portable media devices such as iPods, iPhones and iPads. In particular, Wide Angle Software's TouchCopy and  Extractor for backup and retrieval of lost or deleted iPhone music and messages have been highly rated and reviewed by multiple technology industry magazine and websites, including PCWorld, Lifewire, CNET and Standard-Examiner. Another Mac and Windows App developed by Wide Angle Software is TuneSweeper, which enables users to clean their iTunes libraries of duplicate and missing music. TuneSweeper was featured in Macworld and MacUpdate.

See also
Symantec

References

Software companies of the United Kingdom
Utility software